Kleňany is a village and municipality in the Veľký Krtíš District of the Banská Bystrica Region of southern Slovakia.

Genealogical resources

The records for genealogical research are available at the state archive "Statny Archiv in Banska Bystrica, Slovakia"

 Roman Catholic church records (births/marriages/deaths): 1788-1894 (parish B)
 Lutheran church records (births/marriages/deaths): 1721-1862 (parish B)

See also
 List of municipalities and towns in Slovakia

External links
Statistical Office of the Slovak republic
Surnames of living people in Klenany

Villages and municipalities in Veľký Krtíš District